Door into the Dark (1969) is a poetry collection by Seamus Heaney, who received the 1995 Nobel Prize in Literature. Poems include "Requiem for the Croppies", "Thatcher" and "The Wife's Tale". Heaney has been recorded reading this collection on the Seamus Heaney Collected Poems album.

Contents 

 Night-Piece
 Gone
 Dream
 The Outlaw
 The Salmon Fisher to the Salmon
 The Forge
 Thatcher
 The Peninsula
 In Gallarus Oratory
 Girls Bathing, Galway, 1965
 Requiem for the Croppies
 Rite of Spring
 Undine
 The Wife's Tale
 Mother
 Cana Revisited
 Elegy for a Still-born Child
 Victorian Guitar
 Night Drive
 At Ardboe Point
 Relic of Memory
 A Lough Neagh Sequence 1. Up the Shore
 A Lough Neagh Sequence 2. Beyond Sargasso
 A Lough Neagh Sequence 3. Bait
 A Lough Neagh Sequence 4. Setting
 A Lough Neagh Sequence 5. Lifting
 A Lough Neagh Sequence 6. The Return
 A Lough Neagh Sequence 7. Vision
 The Given Note
 Whinlands
 The Plantation
 Shoreline
 Bann Clay
 Bogland

References

1969 poetry books
Irish poetry collections
Poetry by Seamus Heaney
Faber and Faber books